Werner Zimmermann (19 May 1915 – 1990) was a Swiss slalom and sprint canoeist who competed from the mid-1930s to the mid-1950s. As a slalom canoeist, he won three medals at the ICF Canoe Slalom World Championships with a gold (folding K-1 team: 1949) and two bronzes (folding K-1: 1949, folding K-1 team: 1951). As a sprint canoeist, he competed in two Summer Olympics. At the 1936 Summer Olympics, he finished sixth in the K-2 10000 m event. Twelve years later, he finished 11th in the K-2 10000 m event.

References

External links

1915 births
1990 deaths
Canoeists at the 1936 Summer Olympics
Canoeists at the 1948 Summer Olympics
Olympic canoeists of Switzerland
Swiss male canoeists
Medalists at the ICF Canoe Slalom World Championships